Keratin, type II cytoskeletal 7 also known as cytokeratin-7 (CK-7) or keratin-7 (K7) or sarcolectin (SCL) is a protein that in humans is encoded by the KRT7 gene. Keratin 7 is a type II keratin. It is specifically expressed in the simple epithelia lining the cavities of the internal organs and in the gland ducts and blood vessels.

Function 

Keratin-7  is a member of the keratin gene family. The type II cytokeratins consist of basic or neutral proteins which are arranged in pairs of heterotypic keratin chains coexpressed during differentiation of simple and stratified epithelial tissues. This type II cytokeratin is specifically expressed in the simple epithelia lining the cavities of the internal organs and in the gland ducts and blood vessels. The genes encoding the type II cytokeratins are clustered in a region of chromosome 12q12-q13. Alternative splicing may result in several transcript variants; however, not all variants have been fully described.

Keratin-7 is found in simple glandular epithelia, and in transitional epithelium. Epithelial cells of the lung and breast both contain keratin-7, but some other glandular epithelia, such as those of the colon and prostate, do not. Because the keratin-7 antigen is found in both healthy and neoplastic cells, antibodies to CK7 can be used in immunohistochemistry to distinguish ovarian and transitional cell carcinomas (staining positive) from colonic and prostate cancers (negative), respectively. It is commonly used together with CK20 when making such diagnoses.

Model organisms 

Model organisms have been used in the study of KRT7 function. A conditional knockout mouse line called Krt7tm1b(KOMP)Wtsi was generated at the Wellcome Trust Sanger Institute. Male and female animals underwent a standardized phenotypic screen to determine the effects of deletion. Additional screens performed:  - In-depth immunological phenotyping

References

Further reading 

 
 
 
 
 
 
 
 
 
 
 
 
 
 
 
 
 

Keratins